Robert Beckett (28 November 1862 – 2 June 1917) was an English-born Australian politician.

Early life
He arrived in Melbourne, Australia in 1867 aged five, and settled with his family in Surrey Hills, Victoria.

His father died when he was ten, after which he assumed the role of father in his family.

He initially worked for a printer while continuing his studies, qualifying as a solicitor in his late twenties. Joseph Hood (of Malleson, England & Stewart) secured him articles with Abbott & Eales.

Beckett married Ethel Anna Wells in Sydney, New South Wales on 30 April 1903.

Political career
Becket was a Boroondara shire Councillor from 1892 to 1902, Camberwell shire councillor from 1902 to 1905 and mayor from 1907 to 1908.

Beckett was elected to the Victorian Legislative Council representing East Yarra as a Non-Labor member from June 1913 to June 1917 and died while in office.

Posts held
Becket held the following posts:
 President of the Law Institute 1908-1909
 Commissioner Melbourne and Metropolitan Board of Works 1904-1916
 Vice-president Swinburne Technical College
 Chairman Municipal Building Regulations conference 
 Methodist Sunday School superintendent for 30 years/

Other information
Beckett St and Beckett Park in Balwyn, Victoria are named after him.  He is buried in Box Hill cemetery.

References

 

1842 births
1917 deaths
Mayors of places in Victoria (Australia)
Politicians from Melbourne
Victoria (Australia) state politicians
Burials at Box Hill Cemetery
Members of the Victorian Legislative Council
English emigrants to colonial Australia
People from Surrey Hills, Victoria